The position of Lord High Admiral of the Wash is an ancient hereditary naval office of England. In medieval times, the Lord High Admiral of the Wash was a nobleman with responsibility for the defence and protection of The Wash coast in north East Anglia. The post was granted to the le Strange family after the Norman Conquest.

In the 16th century the post became obsolete and the Royal Navy took over the defence of the area. However, the post was never formally abolished, and remains a hereditary dignity that now has no responsibilities or privileges of any kind. The present Lord High Admiral of the Wash lives in Hunstanton, Norfolk, and inherited the Admiralty through his mother's line.

External links
A site about the holders of the title

Military ranks of the United Kingdom